Janov is a municipality and village in Rychnov nad Kněžnou District in the Hradec Králové Region of the Czech Republic. It has about 100 inhabitants.

Administrative parts
The village of Tis is an administrative part of Janov.

References

Villages in Rychnov nad Kněžnou District